George Burdett ) was an Irish politician.

Burdett was educated at Trinity College, Dublin.

Bunbury was MP for the Irish constituency of  Gowran from 1783 to 1790;Thomastown from 1790 to 1797; and Gowran again from 1798 to 1800

References

Alumni of Trinity College Dublin
Irish MPs 1783–1790
Irish MPs 1790–1797
Irish MPs 1798–1800
Members of the Parliament of Ireland (pre-1801) for County Kilkenny constituencies